Rafael Bordalo Pinheiro (21 March 1846 – 23 January 1905; spelled Raphael Bordallo Pinheiro in older Portuguese orthography) was a Portuguese artist known for his illustration, caricatures, sculpture, and ceramics designs. Bordalo Pinheiro created the popular cartoon character Zé Povinho (1875) and is considered the first Portuguese comics creator.

Life 

Rafael Bordalo Pinheiro was a disciple of his father, the painter Manuel Maria Bordalo Pinheiro. His mother was Donna Maria Augusta do Ó Carvalho Prostes and his brother the painter Columbano Bordalo Pinheiro. 

He started publishing illustrations and political caricatures in humoristic magazines such as A Berlinda and O Calcanhar de Aquiles (the first satirical cartoon pamphlet in Portugal), frequently demonstrating a sarcastic humour with a political or social message.

In 1875, he travelled to Brazil to work as an illustrator and cartoonist for the publication Mosquito (and later, another publication called O Besouro), which was also employing the Italian/Brazilian illustrator Angelo Agostini, until then the unrivaled cartooning authority of Brazil. Pinheiro eventually became editor of other humorous, politically critical magazines. His fame as a caricaturist led the Illustrated London News to become one of his collaborators.

He married Elvira Ferreira de Almeida in 1866 and the following year his son Manuel Gustavo Bordalo Pinheiro was born.

In 1881, he published the illustrated reportage No Lazareto de Lisboa ("The Lazaretto of Lisbon") that included personal thoughts and anecdotes (not unlike a Joe Sacco or Guy Delisle chronicle), and is considered an early example of autobiographical comics.

Rafael Bordalo Pinheiro died on 23 January 1905 in Chiado, Lisbon. He had a Catholic funeral, which was attended by several dozen people, including prominent politicians.

Zé Povinho and comics 

In 1875, Bordalo Pinheiro created the cartoon character Zé Povinho (literal translation: "Joe Little People"), a Portuguese everyman, portrayed as a poor peasant. He became first a symbol of the Portuguese farming poor, and eventually into the unofficial personification of Portugal.

In Zé Povinho, as in his other works, Bordalo Pinheiro's drawing style was innovative and influential, making extensive use of onomatopoeia, graphical signs (such as those used to represent movement), strong images (the manguito), and his unique style of mixing punctuation marks, such as brackets, with drawing.

Pottery 

In 1885, he founded a ceramics factory in Caldas da Rainha, where he created many of the pottery designs for which this city is known. Raphael Bordallo Pinheiro was responsible for the technical and artistic aspects and his brother Feliciano Bordallo Pinheiro was in charge of the organizational aspects of the factory. He developed pieces of great technical, artistic and creative quality, painted tiles (azulejos), panels, pots, table centerpieces, vase busts, fountain basins, pitchers, plates, perfume bottles, vases and gigantic animals, etc., which in his hands quickly acquired an original character.

The factory is still in business. Bordalo Pinheiro was devoted to the production of ceramic pieces

Legacy

The Rafael Bordalo Pinheiro Museum in Lisbon is dedicated to his life and works.

Sources

 Pinheiro, Bordalo (1846 - 1905) Encyclopaedia Itaú Cultural

Notes

External links
 Rafael Bordalo Pinheiro biography on Lambiek Comiclopedia
 Rafael Bordalo Pinheiro biography on Bordallo Pinheiro

1846 births
1905 deaths
Portuguese comics artists
Portuguese artists
Portuguese illustrators
Portuguese potters
Portuguese caricaturists
People from Lisbon
People from Caldas da Rainha